Merguez is a red, spicy mutton- or beef-based fresh sausage in Maghrebi cuisine. In France, merguez became popular in the 1960s and 1970s, as Algerian immigrants and the pieds-noirs of Algeria settled in the country and opened small shops and restaurants that served traditional dishes like merguez.  The popularity of merguez in France was also fueled by the rise of French fast food chains like Quick and McDonald's, which began to offer merguez sandwiches and burgers to cater to their North African clientele.

Merguez is a sausage made with uncooked lamb, beef, or a mixture stuffed into a lamb-intestine casing. It is heavily spiced with cumin and chili pepper or harissa, which give it its characteristic piquancy and red color, as well as other spices such as sumac, fennel and garlic.

Merguez is usually eaten grilled. While not in traditional maghrebi couscous, it is often used in Couscous royal in France. It is also eaten in sandwiches and with french fries and dijon mustard.

Etymology
There are several spellings in Arabic ( mirkas, pl.  marākis;  mirkās,  markas and  mirqāz). It is first attested in the 12th century, as mirkās or merkās.

The Arabic terminology for the food is also the likely origin of the Spanish names of the foodstuffs morcon and morcilla.

See also
 List of African dishes
 Berber cuisine
 Maghrebi cuisine

Notes

References
 Davidson, Alan, "Merguez", Oxford Companion to Food (1999), p. 497. 
 Ch. Pellat, "Mirkās", Encyclopaedia of Islam, 2nd edition.

External links 
Merguez recipe

Maghrebi cuisine
Fresh sausages